Chalab-e Bakr (also Romanized as ChālāwBakr; also known as ChālāwBakr, Chālāv-e Bakr, and Chālaw Bakr) is a village in Howmeh-ye Jonubi Rural District, in the Central District of Eslamabad-e Gharb County, Kermanshah Province, Iran. At the 2006 census, its population was 661, in 148 families.

References 

Populated places in Eslamabad-e Gharb County